Matthew Mark Kinsinger (born March 16, 1977) is a former Arena Football League fullback/linebacker for the Chicago Rush, Las Vegas Gladiators and San Jose SaberCats. He appeared in ArenaBowl XXI.

High school years
While attending Meyersdale High School in Meyersdale, Pennsylvania, Kinsinger was a first team All-County and an All-Conference selection in football, basketball, and baseball.

College career
Kinsinger attended Slippery Rock University, where he played as a defensive lineman. He was a Football Gazette All-America selection.

External links
 Stats from arenafan.com

1977 births
Living people
People from Somerset County, Pennsylvania
American football fullbacks
American football linebackers
Houston ThunderBears players
San Jose SaberCats players
Las Vegas Gladiators players
Chicago Rush players
Players of American football from Pennsylvania
Slippery Rock football players
Augusta Stallions players